Rupak may refer to 
Rupak Tala, a tala in Hindustani music
Rupak Kulkarni (born 1968), Indian musician
Rupak Sarmah, Indian politician for Nowgong constituency, Assam
Rupak Sharma, Indian politician for Nowgong Sadar Assembly Constituency, Assam